Thomas Hope (fl. 1727 – 1734) of Maidstone, Kent, was a British Whig politician who sat in the House of Commons from 1727 to 1734.

Little is known of Hope's background, but he was from Kent, and possibly a butcher. He married Catherine Saunderson, a widow of Hammersmith, at St Magnus the  Martyr on 5 September 1734.

Hope was returned in a contest as  Member of Parliament (MP) for Maidstone with government support at the 1727 British general election. He voted consistently with the Administration, but was defeated at the 1734 British general election. He did not stand himself again, but was an active political agent on behalf of Walpole.

References

Year of birth missing
Year of death missing
People from Maidstone
Members of the Parliament of Great Britain for English constituencies
British MPs 1727–1734